Latin American Bible Institute, California (LABI) is a private coed Bible college in the Avocado Heights district of La Puente, California. It was founded in 1926. In 1950 the institute moved to its current location in La Puente.

The institute was granted an exception to Title IX in 2016 which allows it to legally discriminate against LGBT students for religious reasons. It is ranked among the "Absolute Worst Campuses for LGBTQ Youth" by Campus Pride.

References

External links

Bible colleges
Assemblies of God seminaries and theological colleges
Avocado Heights, California
La Puente, California
Pentecostalism in California
1926 establishments in California
Educational institutions established in 1926